A monosyllabic language is a language in which words predominantly consist of a single syllable.  An example of a monosyllabic language would be Old Chinese or Vietnamese or Burmese. 

Monosyllabism is the name for the property of single-syllable word form. The natural complement of monosyllabism is polysyllabism.

Whether a language is monosyllabic or not sometimes depends on the definition of "word", which is far from being a settled matter among linguists. For example, Modern Chinese (Mandarin) is ""monosyllabic"" if each written Chinese character is considered a word; which is justified by observing that most characters have proper meaning(s) (even if very generic and ambiguous).  However, most entries in a Chinese dictionary are compounds of two or more characters; if those entries are taken as the "words", then Mandarin is not truly monosyllabic, only its morphemes are.

Single-vowel form 
A monosyllable may be complex and include seven or more consonants and a vowel (CCCCVCCC or CCCVCCCC as in English "strengths") or be as simple as a single vowel or a syllabic consonant.

Few known recorded languages preserve simple CV forms which apparently are fully functional roots conveying meaning, i.e. are words—but are not the reductions from earlier complex forms that we find in Mandarin Chinese CV forms, almost always derived with tonal and phonological modifications from Sino-Tibetan *(C)CV(C)(C)/(V) forms.

Suffix and Prefix 
Monosyllabic languages typically lack suffixes and prefixes that can be added to words to alter their meaning or time. Instead, it is frequently determined by context and/or other words. 

For instance in Vietnamese:

Monosyllabic languages omit with modifying words for informal speech, instead basing on context alone.

References

Linguistic typology
Phonotactics